Titila is a shield volcano located in the northern part of Kamchatka Peninsula, Russia. It comprises two shield volcanoes: Titila and Rassoshina, from which Titila is the higher one.

See also
 List of volcanoes in Russia

References 
 

Mountains of the Kamchatka Peninsula
Volcanoes of the Kamchatka Peninsula
Shield volcanoes of Russia
Holocene shield volcanoes
Holocene Asia
Polygenetic shield volcanoes